Walter Shirlaw (August 6, 1838 – December 26, 1909) was a Scottish-American artist.

Biography

Shirlaw was born in Paisley, Scotland, and moved to the United States with his parents in 1840. He worked as a bank-note engraver, and his work was first exhibited at the National Academy  in 1861.

He was elected an academician of the Chicago Academy of Design in 1868. Among his pupils there was Frederick Stuart Church. From 1870 to 1877 he studied in Munich, under Johann Leonhard Raab, Alexander von Wagner, Arthur von Ramberg, and Wilhelm Lindenschmidt.

His first work of importance was the Toning of the Bell (1874), which was followed by Sheep-shearing in the Bavarian Highlands (1876). The latter, which is probably the best of his works, received honorable mention at the Paris exposition in 1878.

A critical appraisal appeared at about this time by the American writer, S.G.W. Benjamin:

Other notable works from his easel are Good Morning (1878), in the Buffalo Academy; Indian Girl and Very Old (1880); Gossip (1884); and Jealousy (1886), owned by the Academy of Design, New York. His largest work is the frieze for the dining-room in the house of Darius O. Mills in New York City. Shirlaw has also earned an excellent reputation as an illustrator. He was one of the founders of the Society of American Artists and its first president.

On his return from Europe he took charge of the Art Students League of New York, and for several years taught in the composition class. He became an associate of the National Academy in 1887, and an academician the following year.

He died in Madrid, Spain on December 26, 1909, and was buried in the British Cemetery there.

Notes

References

External links

1838 births
1909 deaths
19th-century American painters
19th-century American male artists
American male painters
20th-century American painters
Art Students League of New York faculty
Academy of Fine Arts, Munich alumni
Artists from Paisley, Renfrewshire
Scottish emigrants to the United States
Burials at the British Cemetery in Madrid
20th-century American male artists